Below is a list of newspapers published in Romania.

National newspapers

Hungarian language

Local

Transylvania 

Adevărul de Cluj
Brasov.net (online)
Braşovul tău
Bună ziua, Ardeal
Bună ziua Braşov
Cosro - Sibiu
Cotidianul obiectiv
Crişana
Cuvântul Liber
Evenimentul Zilei - Ediţia de Transilvania
Gazeta de Cluj
Gazeta de Hunedoara
Gazeta de Oradea
Hermannstädter Zeitung (weekly in German language)
Informaţia Cluj
Informaţia de Vest
Monitorul de Braşov
Monitorul de Cluj
Monitorul de Făgăraş
Monitorul de Sibiu
ProSport - Ediţia de Transilvania
Realitatea Bihoreană
Repere Transilvane, weekly regional newspaper in Romanian and Hungarian languages
Revista Media
Sibiu Independent
SevenTimes.Ro, in English language
Szabadság, in Hungarian language
Transilvania expres
Transilvania jurnal
Transindex
Tribuna Sibiu
Unirea, one of the oldest newspapers in Transylvania
Vitrina de Cluj
Ziarul Clujeanului
Ziarul Crişana
Ziarul de Mureş
Ziarul Financiar - Ediţia de Transilvania
Ziua de Ardeal
Ziua de Cluj
Clujmedia

Hungarian language 

Bihari Napló, daily local newspaper
Csíki Hírlap, daily local newspaper
Erdélyi Napló, weekly regional newspaper
Gutinmelléki Friss Újság, daily local newspaper
Hargita Népe, daily local newspaper
Háromszék, daily local newspaper
Korunk
manna.ro, online portal
Népújság, daily local newspaper
Polgári Élet, weekly regional newspaper
Repere Transilvane, weekly regional newspaper in Romanian and Hungarian languages
Szabadság, daily local newspaper
Szatmári Friss Újság, daily local newspaper
Szatmári Magyar Hírlap, daily local newspaper
Udvarhelyi Hiradó, daily local newspaper

Banat

Adevărul de Arad
Agenda
Banater Zeitung (German weekly)
Fotbal Vest
Jurnalul de Timiș, http://www.jurnaluldetimis.ro/ 
Magazin M-R
Observator
Prisma - Reşiţa
Renaşterea banăţeană
Timişoara News
Timişoara Times
Timpolis
Virtual Arad
Ziarul Timpului Reşiţa

Hungarian language

Nyugati Jelen, daily local newspaper
Új Szó, weekly local newspaper

Bucovina

Crai Nou - Suceava
Vocea Sucevei

Dobrogea

'Constanța 100% ConstantaFinanciara CTnews TLnewsCuget LiberDobrogea Noua,  weekly regional newspaperReplica de ConstanţaZiua de ConstanţaMoldavia7 Est7 zile - NeamţAccenteArena politiciiCeahlăulContrafort MoldovaDemocraţia MoldovaDeşteptareaDialogEvenimentulFluxImpact Est, GalatiImpartial, GalatiInainte!, BacăuJurnalul de ChişinăuLuceafărul - ChişinăuMoldosportMoldova AziMoldova NewsMonitorul de BacăuMonitorul de BotoşaniMonitorul de GalaţiMonitorul de IaşiMonitorul de NeamţMonitorul de VranceaNews Agency, MoldovaObservator de BacăuObservator EconomicObservatorul de NordPressBox - MoldovaREALITATEA GalatiReporter - MoldovaSăptămânaSud-EstŢaraTimpulTineretul MoldoveiViata libera GalaţiVox Press MoldovaYamZiarul de BacăuZiarul de IaşiZiarul de RomanZiarul de VasluiZiarul de VranceaMunteniaILnewsCLnewsAmprenta BuzăuAnunţul BuzoianCurierul zilei ArgeşGazeta de Sud-EstImpactInfoESTJurnalul de CalarasiMonitorul de BrăilaMonitorul de PrahovaObservator de CalarasiPamantulŞasna buzoianăZiarul de azi Argeş Oltenia Curierul de VâlceaEdiţie SpecialăGAZETA de OLT, local newspaperGAZETA de SUD, local newspaperGAZETA de VÂLCEA, local newspaperVâlcea Online Diaspora Gândacul de Colorado, local newspaperGhidul Românilor, news portal maintained by the Romanian Community in the USAREALITATEA ÎN DIASPORA In German 
National
 Allgemeine Deutsche Zeitung für Rumänien

Local and regional
 Banater Zeitung
 Hermannstädter Zeitung

 In Hungarian 
NationalKrónika, Chronicle, genericÚj Magyar SzóLocal and regionalNépújság, genericSzabadság, Freedom, generic

 In English Hotnews.roMediafax (press agency)Nine O'ClockThe Romanian TimesZiarul Financiar (financial news)Valahia.NewsDefunct newspapersGazeta de Transilvania (1838–1946; 1989–2009)Tipograful Român ( 1865)Universul (1884–1953)Românul de la Pind (1903–1912)Scînteia (1931–1940; 1944–1989)Ziua (1995–2009)Gardianul (2002–2009)Cotidianul (1991–2009)Cronica Română (1993–2012)Prosport (1997–2013)Cancan'' (2007–2013)

See also
 List of magazines in Romania

Lists of newspapers by country

Newspapers